The Draft History of Qing is a draft of the official history of the Qing dynasty compiled and written by a team of over 100 historians led by Zhao Erxun who were hired by the Beiyang government of the Republic of China. The draft was published in 1928, but the Chinese Civil War caused a lack of funding for the project and it was put to an end in 1930. The two sides of the Chinese civil war, the People's Republic of China and Republic of China have attempted to complete it.

History
The Qing imperial court had long established a Bureau of State Historiography and precompiled its own dynastic history.

The massive book was started in 1914, and the rough copy was finished in about 1927.

1,100 copies of the book were published. The Beiyang government moved 400 of the original draft into the northern provinces, where it re-edited the content twice, thus creating three different copies of the book.

It was banned by the Nationalist Government in 1930. Historian Hsi-yuan Chen writes in retrospect, "Not only will the Draft History of Qing live forever, but also Qing history as such will forever remain in draft."

Contents
The draft contains 529 volumes. It attempts to follow the format of previous official histories, containing four sections:

 記/纪 (Ji), containing information about relevant emperors
 志 (Zhi), containing events that happened, i.e. astronomical events
 表 (Biao), containing lists of people who held important posts or were royalty
 傳/传 (Zhuan), containing information concerning notable persons.

Shortcomings of draft
Because of the lack of funding, the authors were forced to publish quickly, and consequently this project was never finished, remaining in the draft stages. The authors openly acknowledged this, and admitted there may have been factual or superficial errors.

The draft was later criticized for being biased against the Xinhai Revolution. Notably, it does not have records of historical figures in the revolution, even those that had been born before the end of the Qing dynasty, although it includes biographies of various others who were born after the collapse of the Qing dynasty. The historians, who were Qing loyalists and/or sympathizers, had a tendency to villainize the revolutionaries. In fact, the draft completely avoided the use of the Minguo calendar, which was unacceptable for an official history meant to endorse the rise of a new regime.

Modern attempts
In 1961, to commemorate the 50th anniversary of the declaration of the Republic of China, the Republic of China government in Taiwan published its own History of Qing, added 21 supplementary chapters to the Draft History of Qing and revised many existing chapters to denounce the Communist Party as an illegitimate, impostor regime. It also removed the passages that were derogatory towards the Xinhai Revolution. This edition has not been accepted as the official History of Qing because it is recognized that it was a rushed job published for political purposes. It does not correct most of the many errors known to exist in the Draft History of Qing.

An additional project, attempting to actually write a New History of Qing incorporating new materials and improvements in historiography, lasted from 1988 to 2000 and only published 33 chapters out of the over 500 projected. The New History was abandoned because of the rise of the Pan-Green Coalition, which saw Taiwan as a separate entity from China and therefore not as the new Chinese regime that would be responsible for writing the official history of the previous dynasty.

In 1961, the People's Republic of China also attempted to complete writing the history of the Qing dynasty, but the historians were prevented from doing so by the Cultural Revolution which started in 1966.

In 2002, the PRC once again announced that it would complete the History of Qing. The project was approved in 2003, and put under the leadership of historian Dai Yi. Initially planned to be completed in 10 years, the completion of the first draft was later pushed to 2016. Chinese Social Sciences Today reported in April 2020 that the project's results were being reviewed.

See also 

 Twenty-Four Histories

References

External links 

 Republic of China New History of Qing (1994) on CTEXT (incomplete)

Chinese-language books
History books about the Qing dynasty
1928 non-fiction books